Baseball at the 2023 Pan American Games is scheduled to be held from October 21 to 27. The venue for the competition is the Baseball and Softball Center, located in Cerillos, a suburb of Santiago.

A total of eight men's teams (each consisting of up to 24 players) will compete. Thus, a total of 192 athletes are scheduled to compete.

Qualification
Eight men's teams will qualify to compete at the games in each tournament. The host nation (Chile) qualified automatically, along with the winner of the 2021 Junior Pan American Games, the winner of the South American Championship, the top four teams at the Americas Series and the top team not yet qualified at the 2023 Central American and Caribbean Games.

Participating nations

A total of 3 countries qualified baseball teams so far. The numbers of participants qualified are in parentheses.

Medalists

References

Baseball
Baseball
Pan American Games
2023 Pan American Games